Steve Sandell (born June 1940) is an American politician and member of the Minnesota House of Representatives. A member of the Minnesota Democratic–Farmer–Labor Party (DFL), he represents District 53B in the eastern Twin Cities metropolitan area.

Early life, education, and career
Sandell graduated from University High School. He attended Brown University, graduating with a Bachelor of Arts in history, and Stanford University, graduating with a Master of Arts in education and public policy.

Sandell is a retired teacher, having taught in Saint Paul, Mendota Heights, and Stockholm, Sweden.

Minnesota House of Representatives
Sandell was first elected to the Minnesota House of Representatives in 2018, defeating Republican incumbent Kelly Fenton. He was reelected in 2020.

2021-2022 Committee Assignments:

 Vice Chair Industrial Education and Economic Development Finance and Policy
 Taxes
 Human Services Finance and Policy
 Higher Education Finance and Policy

2019-2020 Committee Assignments:

 Education Finance
 Education Policy
 Environment and Natural Resources Finance
 Water Division

Electoral history

Personal life 
Sandell and his wife, Eunice Nelson, have two children. He resides in Woodbury, Minnesota.

References

External links

 Official House of Representatives website
 Official campaign website

1940 births
Living people
Democratic Party members of the Minnesota House of Representatives
21st-century American politicians
People from Woodbury, Minnesota
Brown University alumni
Macalester College alumni
Stanford University alumni